Troy Damian Fitrell is an American diplomat who has served as the United States Ambassador to Guinea since January 2022.

Early life and education 

Fitrell earned a Bachelor of Arts at the University of Maryland and a Master of Science at the National War College.

Career 

Fitrell is a career member of the Senior Foreign Service, class of Counselor. He has served as deputy chief of mission at the U.S. embassies in Ethiopia and Mauritius, as deputy director of the department’s Office of Southern African Affairs, and as deputy director of the Office of International Security Cooperation in the Bureau of Political-Military Affairs. He was senior advisor to the United States Special Envoy for the African Great Lakes, coordinating U.S. policy on the cross-border security, political, and economic issues in the Great Lakes region. Fitrell served as a Pearson Fellow on the staff of the House Foreign Affairs Committee and was a watch officer in the Department’s Nuclear Risk Reduction Center.

Ambassador to Guinea
On June 15, 2021, President Joe Biden nominated Fitrell to be the next United States Ambassador to Guinea. On August 5, 2021, a hearing on his nomination was held before the Senate Foreign Relations Committee. On October 19, 2021, his nomination was reported favorably out of committee. On December 18, 2021, the United States Senate confirmed his nomination by voice vote. He assumed office on January 19, 2022.

Personal life
Fitrell speaks French, Spanish, Portuguese, Swedish and Danish.

See also
Ambassadors of the United States

References

Living people
Place of birth missing (living people)
Year of birth missing (living people)
21st-century American diplomats
Ambassadors of the United States to Guinea
National War College alumni
People from Washington (state)
United States Department of State officials
United States Foreign Service personnel
University System of Maryland alumni